The Rhode island Political Cooperative is a progressive political organization founded in Rhode Island in 2019. It ran a slate of 24 candidates in the 2020 Rhode Island elections for the General Assembly, of which eight won their primaries and eight ran unopposed. The candidates campaigned on a platform of a $15 minimum wage, the Green New Deal, single-payer health care, criminal justice reform, affordable housing, quality public education, immigrants' rights, and getting money out of politics. In the 2022 elections, the cooperative ran a total of 27 candidates for the General Assembly, of which three won their primaries & three more ran unopposed.

References

External links
 Rhode island Political Cooperative

Progressive organizations in the United States
Political organizations established in 2019
Organizations based in Rhode Island